

Sweating in cooking is the gentle heating of vegetables in a little oil or butter, with frequent stirring and turning to ensure that any emitted liquid will evaporate.  Sweating usually results in tender, sometimes translucent, pieces. Sweating is often a preliminary step to further cooking in liquid; onions, in particular, are often sweated before including in a stew. This differs from sautéing in that sweating is done over a much lower heat, sometimes with salt added to help draw moisture away, and making sure that little or no browning takes place.

The sweating of vegetables has been used as a technique in the preparation of coulis.

In Italy, this cooking technique is known as soffritto, meaning "sub-frying" or "under-frying". In Italian cuisine, it is a common technique and preliminary step in the preparation of risotto, soups and sauces.

See also 

 Braising
 Frying
 Sautéing

Notes

References

External links

 
 Sweating - Braising - Frying
 Definition
 How to Sweat Vegetables
 hoc nau an

Cooking techniques
Culinary terminology